Chloe Tipple (born 5 June 1991) is a New Zealand sports shooter.

After winning the 2015 Oceania Championships, she is representing New Zealand at the 2016 Summer Olympics in the Women's skeet competition.

Her father is David Tipple, the owner of the Christchurch firearms chain Gun City. David Tipple claims to own the world's biggest gun store.

References

New Zealand female sport shooters
1991 births
Shooters at the 2016 Summer Olympics
Olympic shooters of New Zealand
Living people
Shooters at the 2018 Commonwealth Games
Commonwealth Games competitors for New Zealand
Shooters at the 2020 Summer Olympics